Agdistis hakimah is a moth in the family Pterophoridae. It is known from Bahrain, Saudi Arabia and Yemen.

References

Agdistinae
Moths of the Arabian Peninsula
Moths described in 1985